The Crew is an online sitcom following the lives of the engine room crew of the starship Azureas. A comedy with a financed 15-episode first season run  distributed through blip.tv, YouTube and Koldcast.tv, the show was acquired for an exclusive second season run distributed by Babelgum.

With major distribution for the second season, including The Guilds Robin Thorsen as well as lonelygirl15 herself, Jessica Rose, The Crew has gained attention not only by the hundreds of thousands of views, but also by major traditional news outlets such as The Wall Street Journal.

In 2010, The Crew was nominated for Best Visual Effects at the Second Annual Streamy Awards.

Currently, the show is in pre-production to complete the 12-episode run of its second season.

Characters

Tom Wilkenson (Philip Bache)
Tim Waterson (Brett Register)
Patrick Fargent (Craig Frank)
Andrea Lee (Ariel Lazarus)
Jennifer Parker (Amy Kline)
Stewart Kobbler (Michael Hart)
Amber (Angie Cole)
Luet. Sarah Clauson (Michelle Exarhos)
Crewman Anderson (Stephen Christian)
Crewman Bennett (Zack Finfrock)
Dr. Talia (Cathy Baron)
Evil Patrick (Daniel Norman)
Agule (Robin Thorsen)
Glon (Benny Fine)
Laurent (Payman Benz)
Jala (Chad Jamian)
Map (Jessica Rose)
Corrine (Taryn O'neil)
Tondorf (Sherwood Tondorf III)
Vrock (Daniel Norman)

Plot

Season 1 (2007–2008)

Season 2 (2008-2009)

References

External links 
 Official Show Site
 The Crew on Blip
 Babelgum show site
 The Web. Files meets The Crew

2007 web series debuts
American comedy web series
American science fiction web series